Gorazabad may refer to:
 Gorazabad, Chaharmahal and Bakhtiari
 Gorazabad, Hormozgan
 Gorazabad, Kerman
 Gorazabad, Kermanshah